Hamish James Todd MacKenzie (born 11 March 1945) is a Scottish retired professional football full back who played in the Football League for Brentford.

Career

Early years 
MacKenzie began his career in his native Scotland with Woodburn Athletic, before joining English Second Division club Liverpool in 1960. He signed a professional contract in March 1962, but failed to make a first team appearance before departing Anfield in 1963. MacKenzie returned to his native Scotland to join Scottish League First Division club Dunfermline Athletic in 1963, but failed to make an appearance during the 1963–64 season and departed the club at the end of the campaign.

Brentford 
MacKenzie returned to England to sign for Third Division club Brentford in August 1964. He was mostly confined to the reserve team during his first two seasons with the club and made just three first team appearances. MacKenzie made a breakthrough of sorts during the 1966–67 season and made 20 appearances, but financial cutbacks at the stricken club forced his release at the end of the season. He made just 23 first team appearances for Brentford, but found success with the reserve team, with whom he won the London Challenge Cup in 1964–65 and 1966–67.

Personal life 
MacKenzie's uncle, Duncan McKenzie, was also a professional footballer and played for Brentford and Middlesbrough.

Honours 
Brentford Reserves
 London Challenge Cup (2): 1964–65, 1966–67

Career statistics

References

1945 births
People from Denny, Falkirk
Scottish footballers
Brentford F.C. players
Liverpool F.C. players
English Football League players
Dunfermline Athletic F.C. players
Association football fullbacks
Living people